Alfredo Nicolás Guttero (26 May 1882, Buenos Aires – 1 December 1932, Buenos Aires) was an Argentine modernist painter and art promoter.

Biography
He displayed creative talent at an early age, starting with music but later turning to art. Following his family's wishes, he began a legal career, but left it to become a painter, under the encouragement of Ernesto de la Cárcova and Martín Malharro. In 1904, he received a grant from the Argentinian government to study in Europe and lived in Paris until 1916, where he studied with Maurice Denis and participated in the Salon. Following that, he lived in Segovia and Madrid, with brief stays in Germany, Austria and Italy and visits to virtually every other part of Western Europe, ending with a major exhibition in Genoa.

After more than two decades away from home, he returned in 1927, where he remained intensely active during the five years remaining until his death. Together with Raquel Forner, Alfredo Bigatti and Pedro Domínguez Neira (1894–1970), he created the Cursos Libres de Arte Plástico. In 1931, he exhibited at the First Baltimore Pan-American Exhibition of Contemporary Paintings at the Baltimore Museum of Art. Much of his time and energy was spent promoting modern art, in opposition to the reactionary forces prevalent at that period. His death came suddenly.

A large part of his work involves figures in unusual, kinetic poses, but he also painted landscapes with industrial buildings. His interest in music led him to provide decorations for the Teatro Colón. He also devised a painting technique he called "yeso cocido" (cooked plaster), consisting of plaster and pigments bound with glue and usually applied to wood.

Gallery

References

Further reading
 Julio E. Payró, Alfredo Guttero, (Vol. 12 of Biblioteca argentina de arte), Buenos Aires: Editorial Poseidón, 1943
 Alfredo Guttero: Un artista moderno en acción (Exhibition catalogue), Buenos Aires: MALBA, 2006

External links

 An appreciation of Guttero @ ArtExperts.
 Brief biography and appreciation @ the Argentine Ministry of Education
 Exhibition of Guttero's works in 2006 at MALBA, from Pandorama.

1882 births
1932 deaths
People from Buenos Aires
Modern art
Argentine art directors
20th-century Argentine painters
Argentine male painters
Burials at La Chacarita Cemetery
20th-century Argentine male artists